Ewing Yard (also known as Jefferson Avenue Yard) is a rail yard for the MetroLink light rail system in St. Louis, Missouri. One of the Bi-State Development Agency's major operation and maintenance facilities, the yard maintains the fleet of SD-400 and SD-460 electric light rail vehicles.

The yard opened in 1993 with the first MetroLink line and sits on land bounded by Jefferson Avenue to the west, Scott Avenue to the north, and Ewing Avenue to the east. Bi-State's other rail yard is 29th Street Yard in East St. Louis, Illinois. 

Ewing Yard sits on the former site of Red Stocking Baseball Park.

External links
MetroLink homepage

Metro Transit (St. Louis)
MetroLink (St. Louis) infrastructure
Rail yards in Missouri
MetroLink (St. Louis) yards and shops